Patate Canton is a canton of Ecuador, located in the Tungurahua Province.  Its capital is the town of Patate.  Its population at the 2010 census was 13,497.

The still active  Tungurahua volcano is situated within the canton.

Patate (town and canton) was declared a Pueblo Mágico (magical town) by Ecuador's Ministry of Tourism (MINTUR) in 2019. It was the first community in the country to be awarded this distinction.

References

External links
 Statistical Data Patate
 Patate location in the GIS system of the Province of Tungurahua

Cantons of Tungurahua Province